The Pioneer League is a high school athletic league that is part of the CIF Southern Section. Members are located in the South Bay, Los Angeles.

Member schools
 El Segundo High School
 Lawndale High School
 North Torrance High School
 South Torrance High School 
 Torrance High School
 [[West Torrance High School]
 [[Wiseburn DaVinci High School]

Former members
 Centennial High School
 Leuzinger High School
 Inglewood High School
 Morningside High School
 Beverly Hills High School

References

CIF Southern Section leagues